Erik C. Wiese (born Eric Clark Eldritch; January 24, 1974) is an American animator, storyboard artist, director, and writer who is best known for his work on the animated series SpongeBob SquarePants, beginning with his character development and design for the pilot episode, "Help Wanted", as well as the co-creator of The Mighty B!, where he directed all of the episodes, and served as the creative director, executive producer, writer, voice director and storyboard artist for the series. He studied animation at the California Institute of the Arts.

Wiese's other credits include The SpongeBob SquarePants Movie as a storyboard artist and animator, Rugrats in Paris as a layout artist, Danny Phantom as the lead storyboard artist, The Fairly OddParents as a storyboard artist, The Wild Thornberrys as an additional storyboard artist, and Samurai Jack as a writer and storyboard artist. He has worked on CatDog as a character designer and layout artist, The X's as a storyboard artist, and as a director on the 2000 animated series Sammy.

Wiese served as a character layout artist, animation supervisor, and assistant director to John Kricfalusi at Spümcø, working on the animated Björk music video "I Miss You", and the Ranger Smith cartoons A Day in the Life of Ranger Smith and Boo Boo Runs Wild.

Wiese briefly worked in video games in 1995 as a storyboard and concept artist for Donald Starring in Maui Mallard and The Lion King. In recent years, Wiese served as the storyboard supervisor and head of story on The SpongeBob Movie: Sponge Out of Water, a supervising producer on the French-British animated series Dude, That's My Ghost!, and as a writer for the currently unreleased Star Wars Detours.

He has been married to Cynthia True since May 10, 2007.

Filmography

Film

Television

Video Games

Music video

Brands

References

External links
 
 

Living people
American animators
American storyboard artists
American voice directors
California Institute of the Arts alumni
Spümcø
1974 births
Nickelodeon Animation Studio people
Showrunners